Branchiobdellidae is a family of annelids belonging to the order Branchiobdellida.

Genera

Genera:
 Ankyrodrilus Holt, 1965
 Bdellodrilus Moore, 1895
 Branchiobdella Odier, 1823

References

Annelids